Thallium(III) oxide, also known as thallic oxide, is a chemical compound  of thallium and oxygen. It occurs in nature as the rare mineral avicennite. Its structure is related to that of Mn2O3 which has a bixbyite like structure. Tl2O3 is metallic with high conductivity and is a degenerate n-type semiconductor which may have potential use in solar cells.
A method of producing Tl2O3 by MOCVD is known. Any practical use of thallium(III) oxide will always have to take account of thallium's poisonous nature. Contact with moisture and acids may form poisonous thallium compounds.

Production
It is produced by the reaction of thallium with oxygen or hydrogen peroxide in an alkaline thallium(I) solution.  Alternatively, it can be created by the oxidation of thallium(I) nitrate by chlorine in an aqueous potassium hydroxide solution.

References

Thallium(III) compounds
Sesquioxides